Johan Nordenfalk (9 September 1796 – 9 March 1846) was a Swedish politician, friherre and government 
official, who served as Prime Minister for Justice between 1844–1846.

Biography
Nordenfalk was born into wealthy family of landowners as the son of Carl Fredrik Nordenfalk and Hedvig Sofia Hjärne. 
He received his education at Uppsala University, obtaining a degree in law and came to work as an assessor at the Svea Court of Appeal. Upon the death of his father in 1825, he inherited the family estate and large portions of agricultural land in Ångermanland. Through his marriage the Blekhem manor in Småland also came under his possession.

Between 1828–1831, Nordenfalk was a member of the Estates of the realm. He resigned from his post after coming into conflict with conservative fractions in the diet, among them count Magnus Brahe. After his resignation Nordenfalk returned to his estates, spending much time and investment in agricultural projects.

In 1838, Nordenfalk was raised to the noble rank of friherre.

After the death of king Charles XIV John he became minister without portfolio in the new government and was appointed Prime Minister for Justice later the same year.

Nordenfalk died in 1846 following a brief illness.

References

1796 births
1846 deaths
19th-century Swedish politicians
Swedish Ministers for Justice
Swedish nobility
Members of the Royal Swedish Academy of War Sciences